Thumbs Down is a 1927 American silent drama film directed by Phil Rosen and starring Creighton Hale, Lois Boyd and Wyndham Standing.

Cast
 Creighton Hale as Richard Hale
 Lois Boyd as Helen Stanton
 Wyndham Standing as James Breen
 Helen Lee Worthing as Marion Ames
 Vera Lewis as Mrs. Hale
 Scott Seaton as Mr. Stanton

References

Bibliography
 Munden, Kenneth White. The American Film Institute Catalog of Motion Pictures Produced in the United States, Part 1. University of California Press, 1997.

External links
 

1927 films
1927 drama films
1920s English-language films
American silent feature films
Silent American drama films
American black-and-white films
Films directed by Phil Rosen
1920s American films